Alfred Grosche (born 20 January 1950) is a German ski jumper. He competed at the 1972 Winter Olympics and the 1976 Winter Olympics.

References

External links
 

1950 births
Living people
German male ski jumpers
Olympic ski jumpers of West Germany
Ski jumpers at the 1972 Winter Olympics
Ski jumpers at the 1976 Winter Olympics
People from Winterberg
Sportspeople from Arnsberg (region)